Saška Sokolov (born 15 may 1995) is a Serbian athlete who competed for her nation in the javelin throw at the 2016 Summer Paralympics, and 2020 Summer Paralympics.

Career
Saška Sokolov was born in Pirot, Serbia, the daughter of football coach Sasha Sokolov. As a child, she began to participate in football, but as Pirot did not have a women's team, she switched to handball where she played for ŽRK Pirot. In 2013, she moved to Belgrade, where she attended the Faculty of Special Education and Rehabilitation. She had moved to the capital to study defectology. While there, she took up javelin throw, and became Junior European Champion within three months. She also won the gold medal in the shot put.

While at the 2016 Games, she was one of the youngest competitors. She afterwards spoke of her desire to win the event at the 2020 Summer Paralympics in Tokyo, Japan.

She competed at the 2018 European Championships, where she won a bronze medal.

References

Paralympic athletes of Serbia
People from Pirot
Serbian female javelin throwers
Athletes (track and field) at the 2016 Summer Paralympics
Living people
1995 births
20th-century Serbian women
21st-century Serbian women